Bormida ( or), with a population of 453 spread over an area of , is a rural municipality of the Province of Savona in the Italian region Liguria. The municipality is a member of the Comunità Montana Alta Val Bormida. On May 11, 2017 it was reported that due to a declining population the town's mayor Daniele Galliano recommended a proposal to the Ligurian regional government, and not a confirmed measure, but that it hopes to enact the bonus in 2018 of offering €2,000 ($2,175) and very low rents starting at $50 per month for anyone willing to move there.

Location 

The Bormida di Pallare, a tributary of the Bormida di Spigno, flows through its territory.
 
Bormida borders the villages of Calice Ligure, Calizzano, Mallare, Osiglia, Pallare, and Rialto.

History 
Bormida probably came into existence in the medieval period. However it does not appear in the documentary record until 1549 when Alfonso Del Carretto, lord of Finale Ligure, conceded certain privileges to the local population in a notarized deed.

In 1713, following a period of domination by the Spanish army, Bormida fell under the jurisdiction of the Republic of Genoa. Later in that century it acquired the status of a municipality in its own right, rather than being a part of the municipality of Osiglia, and was almost completely destroyed by the French army of Napoleon Bonaparte during his first Italian campaign.

From 1815 it followed the fortunes of the Kingdom of Sardinia, becoming part of the Kingdom of Italy in 1860.

Architecture
The parish church of San Giorgio, dating back to the year 1200, contains praiseworthy frescos and a wooden Madonna attributed to the sculptor Anton Maria Maragliano. The fifteenth-century campanile was remodelled in the Baroque style.

The palazzo "la Ferriera" ("the Iron-works") is surrounded by a large and interesting park. Its name recalls the fact that iron working was the main economic activity of the area in centuries past.

Festivals 
The feast of the Madonna del Carmine is celebrated on 16 July in the locality Piano Sottano, where a small church is dedicated to her.

Economy 
The principal bases of the local economy are timber and agriculture. Cereals are grown, livestock is raised and cheese is produced.

Roads and railways
Bormida is situated on the Strada Provinciale 339 di Cengio which connects Cengio to Cortemilia. There is no direct link to any autostrada, but from the Autostrada A6 Verdemare, which links Turin to Savona, the Altare exit is the most convenient.

The nearest railway station is at Altare on the Turin–Savona line.

Demographic evolution 
In May 2017, the mayor of Bormida, Daniele Galliano, announced a scheme to attract more residents to the village. New inhabitants would be offered €2,000 to take up residence, as well as subsidised rent for between €50 - €120 per month. After a flood of inquiries, the mayor clarified that the offer was a proposal to the Ligurian regional government.

References
As of 27 October 2007, most of this article was a translation from :it:Bormida, its counterpart in the Italian Wikipedia which releases its content under the GFDL.

Cities and towns in Liguria